Richard Bellamy may refer to:

Richard Bellamy (art dealer) (1927–1998), American art dealer
Richard Bellamy (politician) (1825–1892), farmer, land surveyor and politician in New Brunswick, Canada
Richard Bellamy (singer) (1743–1813), English bass singer
Richard Bellamy (Upstairs, Downstairs), a character in the 1971 TV series Upstairs, Downstairs